Hana Mandlíková defeated the two-time defending champion Martina Navratilova in the final, 7–6(7–3), 1–6, 7–6(7–2) to win the women's singles tennis title at the 1985 US Open.

Seeds

Qualifying

Draw

Final eight

Earlier rounds

Section 1

Section 2

Section 3

Section 4

Section 5

Section 6

Section 7

Section 8

External links
1985 US Open – Women's draws and results at the International Tennis Federation

Women's Singles
US Open (tennis) by year – Women's singles
1985 in women's tennis
1985 in American women's sports